Pallaseopsis quadrispinosa is a species of crustacean belonging to the family Pallaseidae.

It is native to Northern Europe.

Synonym:
 Pallasea quadrispinosa Sars, 1867 (= basionym)

References

Gammaridea
Crustaceans described in 1867